Andrew Thompson (born 9 March 1974) is an Irish former rugby union player.

Career
Born in Borris-in-Ossory, County Laois, Thompson attended Wilson's Hospital School and caught the attention of Limerick club Shannon, who invited him to join their under-18s on a tour of Wales in 1991. Promotion to Shannon's senior team quickly followed, and he was one of only three players who played in all 48 games of Shannon's famous four-in-a-row of All-Ireland League titles between 1994 and 1998.

He featured for Munster during the early years of professionalism, at a time when Irish rugby was slow on the uptake, and Thompson joined French club Stade Montchaninois and English club Bedford briefly after leaving Munster in 1999, before returning to Shannon and being appointed captain ahead of the 2000–01 season. Four more All-Ireland League titles followed for Thompson and Shannon, before he finally retired from rugby in 2011. Since 1998, Thompson has also been a director at engineering firm AECOM.

Honours

Shannon
 All-Ireland League Division 1A:
 Winner (9): 1994–95, 1995–96, 1996–97, 1997–98, 2001–02, 2003–04, 2004–05, 2005–06, 2008–09
 Munster Senior League:
 Winner (3): 2001–02, 2002–03, 2004–05
 Munster Senior Cup:
 Winner (12): 1991, 1992, 1996, 1998, 2000, 2001, 2002, 2003, 2004, 2005, 2006, 2008

References

External links
Munster Profile

Andrew Thompson at LinkedIn

Living people
1974 births
Rugby union players from County Laois
Irish rugby union players
Shannon RFC players
Munster Rugby players
Bedford Blues players
Rugby union wings
Rugby union centres
Rugby union fullbacks
Rugby union fly-halves